Du Xian may refer to:

Du Xian (Tang dynasty) (died 740),  official and general of the Chinese Tang dynasty
Du Xian (news anchor) (born 1954), Chinese news anchor